The Treaty of Bern (formally the Treaty concerning the formation of a General Postal Union), signed on 9 October 1874, established the General Postal Union, which is today known as the Universal Postal Union. Named for the Swiss city of Bern, where it was signed, the treaty was the result of an international conference convened by the Swiss Government on 15 September 1874. It was attended by representatives of 22 nations. Plans for the conference had been drawn up by Heinrich von Stephan, Postmaster-General of the German Reichspost who demanded from the neutral Switzerland the organization of an International Postal Congress following the end of the French-German war of 1870–1871.

The purpose of the treaty was to unify disparate postal services and regulations so that international mail could be exchanged freely. The signatories of the treaty were the German Empire, Austria-Hungary, Belgium, Denmark, Egypt, Spain, the United States, France, Great Britain, Greece, Italy, Luxembourg, the Netherlands, Portugal, Romania, the Russian Empire, Serbia, the United Kingdoms of Sweden and Norway, Switzerland, and the Ottoman Empire.

Originally called the General Postal Union, the organization established by the Treaty was renamed the Universal Postal Union in 1878 due to its large membership. World Post Day is now observed on 9 October recalling the date on which the Treaty was signed.

The Treaty of Bern was amended a number of times after its conclusion. On 10 July 1964, the UPU incorporated the treaty into a new Constitution of the Universal Postal Union, which is now the treaty that is ratified by states when they wish to join the UPU.

See also
List of members of the Universal Postal Union (ratifications of the Treaty of Bern/UPU Constitution)

References

External links 
 Universal Postal Union – About us

Treaty
Treaty
Treaty
1874 treaties
Postal treaties
Treaties of the German Empire
Treaties of Austria-Hungary
Treaties of Belgium
Treaties of Denmark
Treaties of the Khedivate of Egypt
Treaties of the United States
Treaties of the French Third Republic
Treaties of the United Kingdom (1801–1922)
Treaties of the Kingdom of Greece
Treaties of Italy
Treaties of Luxembourg
Treaties of the Netherlands
Bern
Treaties of the United Principalities
Treaties of the Russian Empire
Treaties of the Principality of Serbia
Treaties of the United Kingdoms of Sweden and Norway
Treaties of Switzerland
Treaties of the Ottoman Empire
Treaties of the First Spanish Republic
Treaties of Spain under the Restoration
Treaties of the Principality of Albania
Treaties of the Kingdom of Afghanistan
Treaties of French Algeria
Treaties of the People's Republic of Angola
Treaties of Antigua and Barbuda
Treaties of Argentina
Treaties of Armenia
Treaties of Australia
Treaties of Azerbaijan
Treaties of the Bahamas
Treaties of Bahrain
Treaties of Bangladesh
Treaties of Barbados
Treaties of the Byelorussian Soviet Socialist Republic
Treaties of Belize
Treaties of the Republic of Dahomey
Treaties of Bhutan
Treaties of Bolivia
Treaties of Bosnia and Herzegovina
Treaties of Botswana
Treaties of the Empire of Brazil
Treaties of Brunei
Treaties of the Principality of Bulgaria
Treaties of Burkina Faso
Treaties of Burundi
Treaties of the French protectorate of Cambodia
Treaties of Cameroon
Treaties of Canada
Treaties of Cape Verde
Treaties of the Central African Republic
Treaties of Chad
Treaties of Chile
Treaties of the Republic of China (1912–1949)
Treaties of the United States of Colombia
Treaties of the Comoros
Treaties of the Republic of the Congo
Treaties of Costa Rica
Treaties of Ivory Coast
Treaties of Croatia
Treaties of Cuba
Treaties of Cyprus
Treaties of the Czech Republic
Treaties of North Korea
Treaties of the Congo Free State
Treaties of Djibouti
Treaties of Dominica
Treaties of the Dominican Republic
Treaties of Ecuador
Treaties of El Salvador
Treaties of Equatorial Guinea
Treaties of Eritrea
Treaties of Estonia
Treaties of the Ethiopian Empire
Treaties of Fiji
Treaties of Finland
Treaties of Gabon
Treaties of the Gambia
Treaties of Georgia (country)
Treaties extended to the Gold Coast (British colony)
Treaties of Grenada
Treaties of Guatemala
Treaties of Guinea
Treaties of Guinea-Bissau
Treaties of Guyana
Treaties of Haiti
Treaties of Honduras
Treaties of Iceland
Treaties of India
Treaties of Indonesia
Treaties of the Qajar dynasty
Treaties of Mandatory Iraq
Treaties of the Irish Free State
Treaties of Israel
Treaties of Jamaica
Treaties of the Empire of Japan
Treaties of Jordan
Treaties of Kazakhstan
Treaties of Kenya
Treaties of Kiribati
Treaties of Kuwait
Treaties of Kyrgyzstan
Treaties of the Kingdom of Laos
Treaties of Latvia
Treaties of Lebanon
Treaties of Lesotho
Treaties of Liberia
Treaties of the Kingdom of Libya
Treaties of Liechtenstein
Treaties of Lithuania
Treaties of Madagascar
Treaties of Malawi
Treaties of the Federation of Malaya
Treaties of the Maldives
Treaties of Mali
Treaties of Malta
Treaties of Mauritania
Treaties of Mauritius
Treaties of Mexico
Treaties of Monaco
Treaties of the Mongolian People's Republic
Treaties of Montenegro
Treaties of Morocco
Treaties of the People's Republic of Mozambique
Treaties of Myanmar
Treaties of Namibia
Treaties of Nauru
Treaties of Nepal
Treaties of New Zealand
Treaties of Nicaragua
Treaties of Niger
Treaties of Nigeria
Treaties of Oman
Treaties of the Dominion of Pakistan
Treaties of Panama
Treaties of Papua New Guinea
Treaties of Paraguay
Treaties of Peru
Treaties of the Insular Government of the Philippine Islands
Treaties of the Second Polish Republic
Treaties of Qatar
Treaties of the Korean Empire
Treaties of Moldova
Treaties of Rwanda
Treaties of Samoa
Treaties of San Marino
Treaties of São Tomé and Príncipe
Treaties of the Kingdom of Hejaz and Nejd
Treaties of Senegal
Treaties of Seychelles
Treaties of Sierra Leone
Treaties of Singapore
Treaties of Slovakia
Treaties of Slovenia
Treaties of the Solomon Islands
Treaties of British Somaliland
Treaties of the Orange Free State
Treaties of South Sudan
Treaties of the Dominion of Ceylon
Treaties of Saint Kitts and Nevis
Treaties of Saint Lucia
Treaties of Saint Vincent and the Grenadines
Treaties of the Republic of the Sudan (1956–1969)
Treaties of Suriname
Treaties of Eswatini
Treaties of the Syrian Republic (1930–1963)
Treaties of Tajikistan
Treaties of Thailand
Treaties of North Macedonia
Treaties of East Timor
Treaties of Togo
Treaties of Tonga
Treaties of Trinidad and Tobago
Treaties of Tunisia
Treaties of Turkmenistan
Treaties of Tuvalu
Treaties of Uganda
Treaties of the Ukrainian Soviet Socialist Republic
Treaties of the United Arab Emirates
Treaties of Tanganyika
Treaties of Uruguay
Treaties of Uzbekistan
Treaties of Vanuatu
Treaties of Venezuela
Treaties of North Vietnam
Treaties of Zambia
Treaties of Zimbabwe
Treaties of Serbia and Montenegro
Treaties of Czechoslovakia
Treaties of Yugoslavia
Treaties of the Holy See
Treaties of the Mutawakkilite Kingdom of Yemen
Treaties of the South African Republic
Treaties of the Hawaiian Kingdom
Treaties establishing intergovernmental organizations
Treaties extended to Curaçao and Dependencies
Treaties extended to Norfolk Island
Treaties extended to the British Leeward Islands
Treaties extended to the British Windward Islands
Treaties extended to the Falkland Islands
Treaties extended to Gibraltar
Treaties extended to the Pitcairn Islands
Treaties extended to Saint Helena, Ascension and Tristan da Cunha
Treaties extended to Bermuda
Treaties extended to Canada
Treaties extended to British Hong Kong
Treaties extended to Macau
Treaties extended to the Faroe Islands
Treaties extended to Greenland
Treaties extended to French Guiana
Treaties extended to Guadeloupe
Treaties extended to Martinique
Treaties extended to Réunion
Treaties extended to Mayotte
Treaties extended to Saint Pierre and Miquelon
Treaties extended to French Polynesia
Treaties extended to Clipperton Island
Treaties extended to the French Southern and Antarctic Lands
Treaties extended to New Caledonia
Treaties extended to Wallis and Futuna
Treaties extended to Australia
Treaties extended to British India
Treaties extended to New Zealand
Treaties extended to the Ross Dependency
Treaties extended to the Cook Islands
Treaties extended to Niue
Treaties extended to Tokelau
Treaties extended to Guernsey
Treaties extended to the Isle of Man
Treaties extended to Jersey
Treaties extended to Åland
Treaties extended to Guam
Treaties extended to Puerto Rico
Treaties extended to American Samoa
Treaties extended to the United States Virgin Islands
Treaties extended to the Northern Mariana Islands
Treaties of Ghana